The Delaware, Maryland, and Virginia Railroad is a defunct American railroad that operated passenger service from Broad Street Station in Philadelphia, Pennsylvania to Franklin City, Virginia. At the latter city, steamship connections could be made to Chincoteague, Virginia on the Atlantic Ocean-side exterior islands. The railroad was formed in 1883 through a consolidation of the Junction and Breakwater Railroad and the Breakwater and Frankford Railroad. The Philadelphia, Wilmington and Baltimore Railroad took control in March 1891 after the Delaware, Maryland, and Virginia Railroad approached default on two mortgages totaling $600,000. The Delaware General Assembly met with Delaware, Maryland, and Virginia Railroad directors and those of the Philadelphia, Wilmington, and Baltimore Railroad in order to avoid the default and keep the rail lines open. The Delaware, Maryland, and Virginia Railroad shareholders remained minority owners of the line until 1919, when they were unable to meet financial obligations, and the minority shares were sold to the Pennsylvania Railroad.

The railroad was built out to Chincoteague Bay for the purpose of transporting oysters and other shellfish to Philadelphia.

By the 1910s the Pennsylvania Railroad had leased out or purchased the railroad, appearing on the Pennsylvania Railroad tables of the PRR section of the Official Guide of the Railways of North America. By the end of the 1920s the line was among those rail lines throughout the Delmarva Peninsula that the PRR fully acquired.

The Pennsylvania Railroad passenger trains operated along the route until the late 1940s, stopping at towns just a few miles inland from resort towns on the eastern coast of the Delmarva Peninsula. Frequency along the route dwindled from three trains in each direction at the opening of the 1910s to one train a day in each direction in 1941. The noteworthy towns along the route, south of Wilmington, Delaware consisted of: 
Harrington, Delaware
Ellendale
Georgetown 
Selbyville
Berlin, Maryland 
Snow Hill
Franklin City

The railroad had a branch route in southeastern Delaware, that broke off from the above route at Georgetown, and veered east to Lewes, Delaware and then turned south to Rehoboth Beach, Delaware. However, service on this branch route was eliminated by 1941. 

Passenger service on the line was entirely eliminated by 1949. Today, the line is now truncated to Snow Hill, and the properties have been acquired by the Maryland and Delaware Railroad.

External links
Abandoned Railroads of Delaware
Abandoned Railroads of Maryland
Eastern Shore Railroad history

References

Defunct railroads
Predecessors of the Pennsylvania Railroad
Defunct Virginia railroads
Defunct Maryland railroads
Defunct Delaware railroads